The University of Arkansas System is a state university system in the U.S. state of Arkansas.  It comprises six campuses; a medical school; two law schools; a graduate school focused on public service; a historically black college, statewide research, service, and educational units for agriculture, criminal justice, and archeology; and several community colleges. Over 50,000 students are enrolled in over 188 undergraduate, graduate, and professional programs.

Legally, the entire system carries the name University of Arkansas.  Nonetheless, to avoid confusion with its flagship campus in Fayetteville, the system usually refers to itself as the University of Arkansas System and the Fayetteville campus usually refers to itself as the University of Arkansas.

History
The original and flagship campus was established in Fayetteville as Arkansas Industrial University in 1871 under the 1862 Morrill Land-Grant Colleges Act.  The system now includes both of the state's land-grant colleges, as UAPB was later designated as such under the 1890 Morrill Act; it left the system in 1927, but returned in 1972.  The Division of Agriculture and UAM's forestry programs also contribute to the system's land-grant mission. The Division of Agriculture includes the statewide Arkansas Agricultural Experiment Station (AAES) and the Cooperative Extension Service (CES). AAES and CES were managed by the dean of the College of Agriculture and Home Economics on the Fayetteville campus until 1959, when the Board of Trustees established the statewide Division of Agriculture as a unit of the U of A System.

The University of Arkansas System as an organized educational alliance (system) could be said to date from the founding of UAPB (1873) or perhaps UAMS joining the system (1911). The Division of Agriculture was established in 1959 as a statewide system unit with its own line-item appropriation from the state Legislature. University of Arkansas President David Wiley Mullins, along with the Board of Trustees, brokered a series of mergers in the late 1960s. The Little Rock and Monticello campuses joined the system in 1969 (UALR) and 1971 (UAM), and UAPB returned to the system in 1972. In 1975, a University of Arkansas Board of Trustees policy officially adopted the name "University of Arkansas System" as an alternative identification for the system, along with the present names of the campuses, in order to allow the Fayetteville campus to continue its identification as the "University of Arkansas".  The policy has been amended over the years as other campuses were added.  

In November 2021, the University of Arkansas System acquired Grantham University, a for-profit online college based in Lenexa, Kansas, for one dollar. It was renamed the University of Arkansas Grantham and is the only 100% online institution in the entire system. 

The administrative offices for the University of Arkansas System are located in Little Rock.

University presidents
Up until 1982, the president was the chief administrative officer of the Fayetteville campus and the University of Arkansas System. In 1982, the position of chancellor was created to be the top administrator at the Fayetteville campus, and the title of president referred only to the University of Arkansas System.

University campuses

Medical school

Law schools
(Neither one is officially independent of its parent campus, though the Bowen School of Law is on a separate campus from UALR proper)

Graduate school

Community colleges

Advanced high school
Arkansas School for Mathematics, Sciences, and the Arts

Other system units

Cammack Campus, site of the system headquarters in Little Rock
University of Arkansas System Division of Agriculture
Arkansas Agricultural Experiment Station
Cooperative Extension Service
Arkansas Archeological Survey
Criminal Justice Institute, University of Arkansas System
Winthrop Rockefeller Institute

References

External links
Official website

 
 University of Arkansas System
A